Setup Squad is a 2011 American reality television series from the LGBT-interest network Logo. The series follows the owner and staff of Wings, Inc., a dating agency in New York City specializing in professional dating experts or "wingmen" who give their clients a dating make-over.

Cast
 Renee Lee
 Jonathan Lovitz
 Lauretta Nkwocha
 Helen Hong
 Meredith Schlosser

Episodes

References

2010s American reality television series
2011 American television series debuts
Logo TV original programming